The 1997 Torneo Clausura was part of the 47th completed season of the Primera B de Chile.

Deportes Iquique was tournament’s champion.

League table

Annual table

References

External links
 RSSSF 1997

Primera B de Chile seasons
Primera B
Chil